Jesús Alberto Moreno Salas (born 3 May 1990) is a Mexican former professional footballer who played as a forward.

Career

He debuted with San Luis on July 30, 2011 against Tecos de la UAG, on the 2nd date of the 2011 Apertura Tournament of the Mexican First Division. He then went on to play with Unión de Curtidores in the Second Division of Mexico. Prior to the 2013 Apertura Tournament of the Liga de Ascenso de México, his arrival at the Alebrijes of Oaxaca is confirmed.

He was the top scorer champion in the Copa MX, equaling the Paraguayan midfielder of the UNAM Pumas, Silvio Torales. Moreno scored 5 goals in six games in the group stage of the competition. He scored a triplet to Jaguares de Chiapas on the third date, a goal against Pumas UNAM in the turn of key 1 and on the last day he scored against Cafetaleros de Tapachula to finalize the scoring quintet and thus share the top with the Guaraní Silvio Torales.

On December 16, 2015, the Liga MX draft took place, where Jesús Alberto Moreno is announced as a new signing for Club América. 

The opportunity comes to him, when he returns to play in first, playing for the first time as a starter, on Saturday, February 27, 2016, against the Tigres de la UANL, scoring the first goal of the game and going out of change at minute 75.

After his brief stint at Club América, he arrived in mid-November on loan as a reinforcement of the 2017 Clausura Tournament.

In December 2017, his transfer from Tampico Madero to Correcaminos UAT, archrival of Tampico, was confirmed. This transfer caused the discontent of the celestial fans.

Honours
América
CONCACAF Champions League: 2015–16

References

External links

1990 births
Living people
Mexican footballers
San Luis F.C. players
Chiapas F.C. footballers
Club América footballers
Tampico Madero F.C. footballers
Correcaminos UAT footballers
Association football forwards
Liga MX players
Ascenso MX players